Negativland is an American experimental music band which originated in the San Francisco Bay Area in the late 1970s. They took their name from a Neu! track, while their record label (Seeland Records) is named after another Neu! track.  The core of the band consists of Mark Hosler, David Wills (aka "The Weatherman"), Peter Conheim and Jon Leidecker (aka "Wobbly").

Negativland has released a number of albums ranging from pure sound collage to more musical expositions. These have mostly been released on their own label, Seeland Records.  In the late 1980s and early 1990s, they produced several recordings for SST Records, most notably Escape from Noise, Helter Stupid and U2. Negativland were sued by the band U2's record label, Island Records, and by SST Records, which brought them widespread publicity and notoriety. The band is also part of the Church of the SubGenius parody religion.

History

1980s
Negativland started in Concord, California, in 1979 around the core founding members of Hosler and Richard Lyons (who were in high school at the time), and released an eponymous debut in 1980.

Negativland coined the term culture jamming in 1984. Don Joyce added it to the album JamCon '84 in the form of "culture jammer".

A number of releases followed in the early 1980s, but it wasn't until after the release of their breakthrough sample and cut-up sonic barrage Escape from Noise in 1987 that Negativland gained wider attention. Vinyl copies of the album came with "CAR BOMB" bumper stickers, in reference to the album's song "Car Bomb."

Following the somewhat unexpected success of this album, Negativland faced the prospect of going on a money-losing tour in 1988. To prevent this, they created a press release which said Negativland were prevented from touring by "Federal Authority Dick Jordan" because of claims that Negativland's song "Christianity Is Stupid" had inspired 16-year-old mass murderer David Brom to kill his family. The press release went on to vigorously deny the purported connection between Negativland and the murders. While Brom had in fact argued with his father about music shortly before Brom killed his family, no one had ever claimed that Brom was spurred to murder by Negativland's music. The claim that Brom's crimes were inspired by Negativland was disseminated and discussed in the mass media, seemingly with little to no fact-checking.

The incident became the foundation for Negativland's next release, Helter Stupid, which featured a cover photo of TV news anchorman Dave McElhatton intoning the Brom murder story, with the news station's caption "Killer Song" above his head, and a photo of the ax murderer.

U2 record incident 
Negativland's next project  was the U2 EP, with samples from American Top 40 host Casey Kasem. In 1991, Negativland released a single with the title "U2" displayed in very large type on the front of the packaging, and "Negativland" in a smaller typeface. An image of the Lockheed U-2 spy plane was also on the single cover.

The songs within were parodies of the group U2's well-known 1987 song "I Still Haven't Found What I'm Looking For", including kazoos and extensive sampling of the original song.  The song "The Letter U And The Numeral 2" features a musical backing to an extended profane rant from well-known disc jockey Casey Kasem, lapsing out of his more polished and professional tone during a frustrating rehearsal which had gone out to many stations as raw feed and was taped by several engineers, who had been passing it around for a number of years. One of Kasem's milder comments was "These guys are from England and who gives a shit?" (U2 was actually formed in Ireland. Moments earlier he had read from his script, "the Irish band from Dublin".)

U2's label Island Records quickly sued Negativland, stating that placing the word "U2" on the cover violated trademark law, as did the song itself. Island Records also contended that the single was an attempt to deliberately confuse U2 fans, awaiting the impending release of Achtung Baby, into purchasing what they believed was a new U2 album called Negativland.

In June 1992, R. U. Sirius, publisher of the magazine Mondo 2000, came up with an idea. Publicists from U2 had contacted him regarding the possibility of interviewing Dave "The Edge" Evans, hoping to promote U2's impending multimillion-dollar Zoo TV Tour, which featured found sounds and live sampling from mass media outlets (things for which Negativland had been known for some time). Sirius, unbeknownst to Edge, decided to have his friends Joyce and Hosler of Negativland conduct the interview. Joyce and Hosler, fresh from Island's lawsuit, peppered the Edge with questions regarding his ideas about the use of sampling in their new tour, and the legality of using copyrighted material without permission. Midway through the interview, Joyce and Hosler revealed their identities as members of Negativland. An embarrassed Edge reported that U2 were bothered by the sledgehammer legal approach Island Records took in their lawsuit, and furthermore that much of the legal wrangling took place without U2's knowledge: "by the time we [U2] realized what was going on it was kinda too late, and we actually did approach the record company on your [Negativland's] behalf and said, 'Look, c'mon, this is just, this is very heavy...'" Island Records reported to Negativland that U2 never authorized samples of their material; Evans' response was, "that's complete bollocks, there's like, there's at least six records out there that are direct samples from our stuff."

In August 2007, Joyce provided an audio cassette copy of the Mondo 2000 interview with Evans to the U2 fan website U2Interview.com.

The "U2" single (along with other related material) was re-released in 2001 on a "bootleg" album entitled These Guys Are from England and Who Gives a Shit, released on "Seelard Records" (a parody of Negativland's record label Seeland Records). Negativland may have themselves been responsible for the re-release; although the Negativland website refers to this release as a bootleg, it is available from major retailers like Best Buy, Amazon, and Tower Records, as well as Negativland's own mail-order business.

Negativland are interested in intellectual property rights, and argue that their use of U2's and others' material falls under the fair use clause. In 1995, they released a book, with accompanying CD, called Fair Use: The Story of the Letter U and the Numeral 2, about the whole U2 incident (from Island Records first suing Negativland for the release to Negativland gaining back control of their work four years later). The book ends with a large appendix of essays about fair use and copyright by Negativland and others, telling the story with newspaper clippings, court papers, faxes, press releases and other documents arranged in chronological order.  

The Negativland-Island lawsuit was followed by another one brought on between Negativland and SST, which served to sever all remaining ties the two had.  To get back at Negativland (while wryly circumventing their name), SST founder Greg Ginn later released the Negativ(e)land: Live on Tour album on SST.

Negativland were the main subjects of Craig Baldwin's documentary Sonic Outlaws, detailing the use of culture jamming to subvert the messages of more traditional media outlets. They also made an appearance in Brett Gaylor's 2009 copyright issue documentary, RiP!: A Remix Manifesto.

ABCs and Teletubbies

In 1999 Negativland collaborated with UK anarchist band Chumbawamba to produce the EP The ABCs of Anarchism, which is largely based around the writings of Alexander Berkman and cut-up versions of Chumbawamba's hit song "Tubthumping", the theme tune to the children's program Teletubbies and the Sex Pistols' "Anarchy in the UK".

2000s
In 2003, members of Negativland contributed their efforts to Creative Commons, a non-profit organization devoted to expanding the range of creative works available for others to legally build upon and share by providing alternative copyright licenses. In September 2002, Negativland spoofed Clear Channel radio stations in an audio track broadcast by pirate radio broadcasters jamming a Seattle Clear Channel station while the National Association of Broadcasters met in the city.

Former member Don Joyce long hosted a weekly radio show called Over the Edge most Thursdays at midnight on KPFA.  Recordings of some noteworthy episodes of the show have been released by Seeland in its Over the Edge series.

In September 2005, to celebrate the 25th anniversary of the band, Negativland curated an art exhibit in Manhattan's Gigantic Artspace gallery, formerly located at 59 Franklin Street. The exhibit, Negativlandland, included a number of pieces of artwork from and inspired by Negativland recordings, video projection of music videos created by the band and others, and some artwork created specifically for the show, such as an animatronic Abraham Lincoln figure (inspired by the band's Lincoln cut-up piece God Bull) and a hands-on exhibit featuring the Booper, the audio-processing unit that band member David Wills (a.k.a. The Weatherman) assembled out of old radio parts. The show appeared in Minneapolis on May 12, 2006, at Creative Electric Studios.

2010s

Former band member Ian Allen died on January 17, 2015, due to complications from heart valve surgery. He was 56 years old. On July 22, 2015 Don Joyce, group member and host of Over The Edge, died of heart failure at the age of 71. On April 19, 2016, Richard Lyons died from complications of nodular melanoma following his 57th birthday party in a nursing facility.

The band's album, Over the Edge Vol. 9: The Chopping Channel, was released on October 21, 2016. Select copies of the album include a bag containing two grams of Don Joyce's cremated remains. In 2019, True False was released.

2020s
The album The World Will Decide was released on November 13, 2020 and features contributions from Allen, Joyce, and Lyons.

Discography

Albums
Negativland (1980)
Points (1981)
A Big 10-8 Place (1983)
Escape from Noise (1987)
Helter Stupid (1989)
Free (1993)
Fair Use: The Story of the Letter U and the Numeral 2 (1995)
Dispepsi (1997)

Deathsentences of the Polished and Structurally Weak (2002)
No Business (2005)
Thigmotactic (2008)
It's All in Your Head (2014)
True False (2019)
The World Will Decide (2020)
Speech Free: Recording Music for Film, Radio Internet and Television (2022)

Videos
No Other Possibility (1989; re-released in 2008 with A Big 10-8 Place)
Our Favorite Things (2007)

Over the Edge radio series
 (CDs edited from Negativland's weekly live radio show. The first four releases were also manufactured on cassette)
Over the Edge Vol. 1: JAMCON'84 (1985)
Over the Edge Vol. 1½: The Starting Line with Dick Goodbody (1985, partial reissue in 1995)
Over the Edge Vol. 2: Pastor Dick: Muriel's Purse Fund (1989)
Over the Edge Vol. 3: The Weatherman's Dumb Stupid Come-Out Line (1990)
Over the Edge Vol. 4: Dick Vaughn's Moribund Music of the '70s (1990, expanded reissue in 2001)
Over the Edge Vol. 5: Crosley Bendix: The Radio Reviews (1993)
Over the Edge Vol. 6: The Willsaphone Stupid Show (1994)
Over the Edge Vol. 7: Time Zones Exchange Project (1994)
Over the Edge Vol. 8: Sex Dirt (1995)
Over the Edge Vol. 9: The Chopping Channel (2016)

EPs
U2 (1991)
Guns (1992)
The Letter U and the Numeral 2 (1992)
Truth in Advertising (1997) (See also: Dispepsi)
Happy Heroes (1998)
The ABCs of Anarchism (1999) (Together with Chumbawamba)

Live albums
Negativconcertland (1993)
Negativ(e)land: Live on Tour (1997)
It's All in Your Head FM (2006)

References

External links

Negativland stuff
Negativland - Past, Present, Future mp3 of Mark Hosler's talk at H2K2 in 2002
KJR Culture Jam Audio produced by Negativland for the 2003 Clear Channel protest in Seattle
Mark Hosler discusses with a manager for REM how he sent the controversial album to U2 implying that U2 may have lied about knowing nothing about the album or lawsuit

Interviews
 Art and Commodity Capitalism Interview with Mark Hosler, Plazm Magazine (1996)
 Radio Feature, The Some Assembly Required Interview with Negativland's Mark Hosler (2004)
 Radio Feature, The Some Assembly Required Interview with Negativland's Don Joyce (2001)
 Interview with Don Joyce at Kurt Weller's Plaza of the Mind
 Interview with Don Joyce at Perfect Sound Forever (June 2000)

American experimental musical groups
Culture jamming
Culture of Concord, California
Fair use
Copyright activists
Musical groups established in 1979
1979 establishments in California
Musical groups from California
American industrial music groups
SST Records artists
American SubGenii